AA-7 or AA7 may refer to:

 Vympel R-23, a Soviet medium-range air-to-air missile whose NATO reporting name is the AA-7 'Apex'
 Gardiner's designated symbol for a hieroglyph (Aa7)
 Auxiliary Activity Family 7, a group of FAD-containing oxidoreductase enzymes